Aksyon may refer to

Aksyon Demokratiko, a Philippine political party
Aksyon (TV program), a 2010–2020 Philippine news program
AksyonTV, a 2011–2019 Philippine news channel
Avksenty (diminutive: Aksyon), a Russian male given name

See also